Chittaway Bay is a suburb of the Central Coast region of New South Wales, Australia. It is part of the  local government area.

The main road through the suburb, Chittaway Road, has on it a four star motel, service station, and a shopping centre known as Chittaway Centre, it also has a pub called Chittaway Bay Tavern, but more commonly known to locals as "The Tav".

Population
According to the 2016 census of Population, there were 2,028 people in Chittaway Bay.
 Aboriginal and Torres Strait Islander people made up 5.2% of the population. 
 83.1% of people were born in Australia and 90.8% of people spoke only English at home. 
 The most common responses for religion were No Religion 26.5%, Anglican 26.0% and Catholic 25.3%.

References

Suburbs of the Central Coast (New South Wales)
Bays of New South Wales